Sir Harold William Stannus Gray, KBE (16 August 1867 – 23 May 1951) was an Anglo-Irish landowner, horse breeder and politician. He served a brief period as a Member of Parliament during which he pressed for more help for agriculture.

Family and education
Gray's father, Major George Gray, was a Deputy Lieutenant for County Antrim and he was born there at the family estate of Graymount. His father died in 1879 and Gray inherited the estate at that time, although he continued his education.  In 1881 he entered Eton College but left after only a year; he went up to Magdalene College, Cambridge in 1885. After obtaining his degree he returned to Graymount to run the estate. Gray married his cousin, Rowena Stannus, the daughter of a County Antrim Justice of the peace, in 1894.

Horse breeding
Both at his estate in County Antrim and at an estate on the Gog Magog Hills in Cambridgeshire which he bought in 1904, Gray became a very successful breeder of thoroughbred racehorses, running some of them on the English and Irish turf. He also played a part in society, being High Sheriff of County Antrim in 1895. During World War I, Gray and his wife went to France to help in hospitals treating wounded allied troops, and Gray drove a motor ambulance for the French Red Cross. He also became a Justice of the Peace for County Antrim himself.

Election to Parliament
Gray's English land was in the Cambridgeshire constituency. At the time of the 1922 general election, the MP was Edwin Montagu, who had been Secretary of State for India in the Coalition government. Montagu's policy was unpopular with Conservatives and he had been sacked from his ministerial office in March 1922 after publishing a telegram from the Indian government which was critical of government policy. Montagu stood for re-election as a Liberal without pledging himself to either David Lloyd George or H. H. Asquith. The Conservatives had been expecting to have to support Montagu as a Coalition candidate. At a late stage, the "die-hard" section within the Cambridgeshire Conservatives decided to stand a candidate against Montagu, who would have the backing of the party centrally and Gray was chosen as their candidate at the end of October 1922.

Agricultural issues
In his election address Gray concentrated on farming policy, complaining that the Coalition government had promised farmers support, but had withdrawn it. He supported marking all foreign imported eggs. He also favoured building a large number of homes for affordable rents. The campaign went poorly for the Liberals, who were reported by the last week of the campaign to be "despondent" about Montagu's chances. Gray won the election with a small majority over the Labour candidate, with Montagu in third place. As a Member of Parliament Gray concentrated on agricultural subjects, asking the Minister to introduce legislation to raise the wages of farm labourers. In line with his election pledge he supported the Merchandise Marks Bill introduced by E. G. Pretyman which provided that all imported material must be marked with its country of origin.

Later life
When a new election was called in November 1923, Gray was ill, and was forced to stand down from the candidature; he therefore left Parliament. He renewed his involvement in public life when he recovered, becoming a County Councillor in Cambridgeshire and serving as High Sheriff of Cambridgeshire and Huntingdonshire in 1939–40. He was awarded the honour of Knight Commander of the Order of the British Empire "for political and public service in Cambridgeshire" in the King's birthday honours list for 1938.

Gray's only son Terence became well known as the Taoist philosopher Wei Wu Wei.

References

External links
  

1867 births
1951 deaths
Alumni of Magdalene College, Cambridge
British racehorse owners and breeders
Conservative Party (UK) MPs for English constituencies
Knights Commander of the Order of the British Empire
People educated at Eton College
UK MPs 1922–1923
High Sheriffs of Cambridgeshire and Huntingdonshire